Bassey is both a surname and a given name. Notable people with the name include:

 Ahmed Abdulshafi Bassey, Sudanese rebel leader
 Calvin Bassey, (born 1999), Nigerian-British professional footballer
 Charles Bassey (born 2000), Nigerian basketball player
 Ebbe Bassey, Nigerian-American actress
 Essang Bassey (born 1998), American football player
 Jennifer Bassey (born 1942), American actress
 Shirley Bassey (born 1937), British singer
 Bassey Ikpi (born 1976), Nigerian-American spoken word poet